The 6th Cruiser Squadron  was a formation of cruisers of the British Royal Navy from 1909 to 1915 and again from 1925 to 1945.

The Royal Navy's cruiser squadrons usually contained a maximum of five to six ships but down but sometimes as low as two to three ships. Between 1914 and 1925, they were designated Light Cruiser Squadrons, and after 1925 re-designated Cruiser Squadrons.

First formation
The squadron was established in March 1909. In September 1910, it was attached to the Mediterranean Fleet until April 1912. In May 1912, the 6th Cruiser Squadron was renamed the Mediterranean Cruiser Squadron. The squadron was then reassigned as the 6th Cruiser Squadron to the Second Fleet between May 1912 and July 1914.

Rear-Admiral Commanding

Second formation 1925 - 1945 
The squadron reformed in 1925 when it was allocated to the Commander-in-Chief, Africa until August 1939 when the post was redesignated Commander-in-Chief, South Atlantic. The posts of the admiral commanding the squadron and the regional Commander-in-Chief were not usually separated. It remained attached there until 1945 when it was disbanded.

Admirals Commanding

Notes

References 
 Friedman, Norman (2012). British Cruisers of the Victorian Era. Barnsley, England: Seaforth Publishing. .
 Frowde, H. (1914). The New Hazell Annual and Almanack Vol 29. Oxford, England: Oxford University Press.
 Watson, Dr Graham. (2015) "Royal Navy Organization and Ship Deployments 1900-1914". www.naval-history.net. Gordon Smith.
 Watson, Dr Graham. (2015) "Royal Navy Organization and Ship Deployment, Inter-War Years 1919-1939: Cruiser Deployment 1919-1939". www.naval-history.net. Gordon Smith.
 Watson, Dr Graham. (2015) "Royal Navy Organization in World War 2, 1939-1945". www.naval-history.net. Gordon Smith.

Cruiser squadrons of the Royal Navy
Military units and formations of the Royal Navy in World War I
Squadrons of the Royal Navy in World War II
North Sea operations of World War I